Ilha Grande is one of the four coastal cities of Piauí, Brazil. It is also the northernmost city of the state.

The municipality contains part of the  Delta do Parnaíba Environmental Protection Area, created in 1996.

References 

Populated places established in 1997
Populated coastal places in Piaúi
Municipalities in Piauí